Walter Church (born July 23, 1978) is a former American football quarterback for the New York Dragons and Dallas Desperados of the Arena Football League (AFL). He played college football at Eastern Michigan.

Early life
Church attended Ypsilanti High School in Ypsilanti, Michigan.

College career
Church continued his football career at Eastern Michigan. Church still holds school records for most passing yards and total yards in a career.

Statistics
Church's statistics are as follows:

Professional career
Church was rated the 27th best quarterback in the 2001 NFL Draft by NFLDraftScout.com.

Detroit Drive
He played for the New York Dragons of the Arena Football League in 2003.

Tampa Bay Storm
Church served as a backup in 2004 with the Dallas Desperados.

AFL statistics

Stats from ArenaFan:

References

1978 births
Living people
American football quarterbacks
Eastern Michigan Eagles football players
New York Dragons players
Dallas Desperados players
Players of American football from Michigan
Sportspeople from Ypsilanti, Michigan